Highway 9 is a paved, undivided provincial highway in the Canadian province of Saskatchewan. It runs from North Dakota Highway 8 at the US border near Port of Northgate until it transitions into Provincial Road 283 at the Manitoba provincial boundary. The Saskota Flyway (Highway 9) is known as the International Road to Adventure, because it takes you from Hudson Bay, Saskatchewan, all the way south to Bismarck, North Dakota. Highway 9 is about 606 km (376 mi.) long and passes through Carlyle, Yorkton, Canora, Preeceville, and Hudson Bay. It intersects Highway 1, Highway 16, and Highway 5. Highway 9 is a gravel surfaced road from Hudson Bay north to the Manitoba border, passing the junction with Highway 55. Highway 9 is also known as the Saskota Flyway Scenic Drive Route or Saskota Flyway while the section between Highway 55 and the Manitoba border is part of the Northern Woods and Water Route.

Communities

Starting at the Port of Northgate and Elcott, which are unincorporated areas of Enniskillen No. 3 Rural municipality, the highway crosses the Souris River before reaching Alameda, a town which had a population of 308 residents in 2006. The highway then crosses Moose Mountain Creek before passing through Carlyle on its way north into the Moose Mountain Upland. As of 2016, Carlyle's population was 1,508 people. Carlyle is located at the intersection of Sk 9 with Sk 13, the Red Coat Trail. The town has been dubbed the "gateway to the Moose Mountain resorts." Carlyle Lake Resort, White Bear, Kenosee Lake, and Moose Mountain Provincial Park are north of Carlyle along the route.

The land in this area was surveyed by 1881 ... A space of sixty- six feet wide between sections was left for a road allowance, every mile running north and south and every two miles running east and west. 

The prairie dirt trails were the first used. Walking ploughs could loosen up earth, then two horse scrapers called fresnos could grade the low places. These projects could be undertaken by pioneer settlers who wished to work to help pay homestead taxes. Two horse teams were replaced by fours horse teams and larger scrapers. Crawler tractors eventually replaced horse teams to pull larger scrapers and graders.

No. 9 was surveyed in 1929 and graded in 1930-31. These roads were first gravelled in 1930-31 and 1933. This made for safer driving in rainy weather, but very dusty in dry weather. Sometimes these clouds of dust were the cause of accidents on the highways. Next these roads were re-built for oiled surfaces - No. 9 to the lakes in 1956, and south of town in 1964-65....The oiled surface reduced the dust hazard, but kept breaking up under heavy loads...When potash was discovered...better surfacing was requited. So the highway were once again built up to make them wider, and No. 9 got heavy-duty paving to withstand the heavy loads. This was done in 1969-1970... 

A government road project of 1931 connected White Bear (Carlyle) Lake to Fish Lake. Harry Cochrane and his crew began in the south at White Bear Lake, Bill Henderson and his crew began in the north at Fish Lake. The first name of Kenosee Lake was Fish Lake. The Scenic Highway Relief Project was begun travelling south to north west of the present highway. The route was blazed, trees felled, stumps dynamited, and the cleared area ploughed, in order to prepare it for the construction. All this work as soon overgrown with native flora, and the road was never developed between McGurk Lake to the south and Stevens Lake and Hewitt Lake at the north end.

About 1952, rural municipal councils realized they had to improve their road system to accommodate heavier loads and faster traffic.... road standards were set by the Government. Finally it was agreed the Government would pay sixty percent and the municipality the remainder

These crews provide winter maintenance such as removing snow and ice, and summer maintenance such as drainage, sign and guardrail repair. Langbank is an unincorporated area of Silverwood No. 123 Rural municipality. Pipestone Creek is traversed by Sk 9 between Langbank and Whitewood. Whitewood had a population of 869 in 2006 and is located at the intersection of Sk 1 TransCanada Highway and Sk 9. The Qu'Appelle River and Round Lake demark the northern perimeter of Ochapowace Indian Reserve. Stockholm, a village of 323 in 2006, is situated at the beginning of the concurrency of Highway 9 with Sk 22. Dubuc a village of 55 folk is north of Crooked Lake and Crooked Lake Provincial Park. In 1926, Bangor was located on Sk 9 and not Dubuc. Kaposvar Creek is crossed en route to Crescent Lake an unincorporated area of Cana No. 214 Rural municipality. Leech Lake is west of the Highway 9. Upper and Lower Roussay Lakes, Crescent Lake, and Leech Lake are south of Yorkton. Yorkton is at the intersections of Sk 9, Sk 10 and Sk 16 the Yellowhead. In 1922 a severe flood covered about 50% of the land between Yorkton and Canora taking out road and railway grades. Grades on which there has been no water for the past nine years have been submerged. The Canora road is under water for two miles, and the only mode of transportation to the Reman school is by boat. Almost all the bridges in Wallace Municipality are washed out....the roads between Canora and Yorkton are washed out in so many places that it will be well into the summer before auto traffic between these places will be possible.Ebenezer a village of 139 people in 2006 is next on the journey. Whitesand River is traversed on the way to the town of Canora. Canora is located at the intersections of Highway 9 with Sk 651 and Sk 5. Crooked Hill Creek is crossed en route to Sturgis. The Assiniboine River, and South Etomami River pass near Sturgis. Sturgis & District Regional Park is located south of the highway. The Assiniboine River also ran alongside the town of Preeceville. In 1926, Preeceville was the northern terminus of Sk 9. It has grown to be a town of 1,050 residents (2006). A few places sprang up along the rail line between Preeceville and Hudson Bay, according to the 1948 Waghorn's Saskatchewan map. This area between Preeceville and Hudson Bay is the Porcupine Provincial Forest. Crossing the Red Deer River, the next settlement is Hudson Bay. The Etomami River, Little Swan River, and Swan River are south of Hudson Bay. First incorporated as the Village of Etoimami (also recorded as Etoimomi) on August 22, 1907, then the village of Hudson Bay Junction in 1909. On November 20, 1946, the Town of Hudson Bay Junction was created, and on February 1, 1947, the term junction was dropped becoming the town of Hudson Bay. The Junction was the Fir River, Etoimami River joining with the Red Deer River. The town of Hudson Bay was termed "Saskatchewan's Port of Entry to the Port of Churchill and Gateway to Hudson's Bay." The town has a population of 1,646 on the 2006 census. Quite a few rivers were traversed after Hudson Bay before crossing the Manitoba-Saskatchewan provincial boundary en route to The Pas, Manitoba. Fir River, Chemong River, and Waskwei river are all near Wildcat Hill Provincial Park in the Pasquia Hills. The Wildcat Hill Provincial Park was previously the Pasquia Hills Forest Reserve. Carrot River marks the northern perimeter of Highway 9, as the road runs parallel to this river before leaving Saskatchewan and after entering Manitoba.

Major intersections 
From south to north:

See also
Roads in Saskatchewan
Transportation in Saskatchewan

References

External links

 How Roads Were Built
 Unofficial Saskatchewan Highways website
 Moose Mountain Provincial Park

009
Northern Woods and Water Route
Transport in Yorkton
Buchanan No. 304, Saskatchewan
Gravel roads